Žarko Karamatić (born 8 June 1988) is a Serbian footballer.

Career 
Karamatić was born in Zvečan, to Serbian parents Zoran and Zorica. After starting out with the hometown side FK Trepča, Karamatić was noticed by Mladost Apatin where he moved in the early 2000s. He stayed there until 2010, when he moved to Banat Zrenjanin. After a short spell with them and later with Radnički 1923 and Slavija Sarajevo, Karamatić signed for FK Sarajevo where he managed to score one goal and make two assists in the six games that Sarajevo played in UEFA Europa League qualifications that season.

References

External links

1988 births
Living people
Serbian footballers
Serbian expatriate footballers
Expatriate footballers in Bosnia and Herzegovina
Association football midfielders
FK Mladost Apatin players
FK Banat Zrenjanin players
FK Radnički 1923 players
FK Slavija Sarajevo players
FK Sarajevo players
FK Radnik Bijeljina players
FK Trepča players
NK Travnik players
Kosovo Serbs